This is a recap of the 2003–04 season for the Professional Bowlers Association (PBA) Tour.  It was the tour's 45th season and consisted of 21 events.

Finland's Mika Koivuniemi made seven TV finals, won twice on the season, and joined Venezuela's Amleto Monacelli as the only international players to ever win the PBA Player of the Year award. Mika also rolled the PBA's 16th televised 300 game this season.

Patrick Healey Jr. ended the three-event run by Jason Couch at the Tournament of Champions, one of two titles that Healey won on the season. Walter Ray Williams, Jr. was victorious at the ABC Masters.

After becoming just the fourth bowler to reach 30 career PBA titles earlier in the year, Pete Weber won his 31st at the 61st U.S. Open. It was Weber's third career U.S. Open crown. The final major of the season, the PBA World Championship, was won by 49-year-old Tom Baker for his first win in seven years.

Tournament schedule

References

External links
2003–04 Season Schedule

Professional Bowlers Association seasons
2003 in bowling
2004 in bowling